Charles Moore Wheatley (16 March 1822 – 6 May 1882) was an American miner and palaeontologist of the 19th century.  He is noted for identifying several new fossilized species, some of which bear his name, and for his connection to the Port Kennedy Bone Cave, which contained one of the most important middle Pleistocene (Irvingtonian, approximately 750,000 years ago) fossil deposits in North America. In 1879, he was elected as a member to the American Philosophical Society.

He also managed successful mines in Connecticut and Pennsylvania, including a lead mine in Phoenixville, Pennsylvania.

Species

Cychrus Wheatleyi
Megalonyx wheatleyi

Notes

References 
 Wheatley biography at The Mineralogical Record

External links

1822 births
1882 deaths
American paleontologists
American miners
English emigrants to the United States
People from Chipping Ongar